Merveille Goblet (born 20 November 1994) is a Belgian footballer who plays as a goalkeeper.

Club career 

Goblet is a youth exponent from Standard Liège. He played on loan for AFC Tubize during the season 2013/14 and 2014/15. In 2015, he joined Waasland-Beveren. On 3 October 2015, he made his Belgian Pro League debut with Waasland-Beveren against Sint-Truiden.

International career
Goblet is Belgian-born of Congolese descent, and is a youth international for Belgium.

References

External links
 

1994 births
Living people
Belgian footballers
Belgium youth international footballers
Belgian sportspeople of Democratic Republic of the Congo descent
Standard Liège players
A.F.C. Tubize players
S.K. Beveren players
Cercle Brugge K.S.V. players
Belgian Pro League players
Association football goalkeepers